Alex Codling born 25 September 1973 in Lewisham is a former Rugby Union lock forward.

He won his only cap for England under Sir Clive Woodward against  in 2002. After retiring from playing rugby union, he became the Head of Sport at Trinity School in Shirley, where he was until November 2012. He was previously the coach with Ebbw Vale RFC whom he was with for a season and a half, saving them from relegation in his first half season and leading them to the 
runners up spot in his second and last season. It was reported that Codling drove from his Surrey home to every Ebbw Vale match and training session.

Codling left Ebbw Vale in April 2007 and was soon appointed forwards coach at the RFU Championship club London Welsh.
After leaving the Exiles in February 2008, Codling took up the role of part-time forwards coach at Barking. In October 2008, he took over as head coach of Cardiff RFC.
In 2011/12 season Codling was unveiled as forwards coach for newly promoted RFU Championship team London Scottish.

On 16 November 2012, Codling signed a 2-year deal to become the head coach of Rotherham Titans, unlike with previous roles, Codling resigned from his position as a teacher to fully focus on his career as a rugby coach.

References

External links
 Scrum.com profile
 Independent article
 Saracens profile

1973 births
Living people
England international rugby union players
English rugby union coaches
English rugby union players
People educated at Trinity School of John Whitgift
Rugby union locks
Rugby union players from Lewisham
Saracens F.C. players